In American politics, a Libertarian Republican is a politician or Republican Party member who has advocated Libertarian policies while typically voting for and being involved with the Republican Party.

Beliefs and size

The Republican Party has historically been divided into factions. In a 2014 Pew Research Center survey on political typology and polarization, 12% of Republicans described themselves as libertarian. In 2012, the libertarian branch of the party was described as smaller than other branches, including Tea Party voters (the "populist, more radical Tea Party wing" of the party), pragmatic "Main Street" Republicans, and evangelical Christian conservatives.
According to a 2012 New York Times analysis, libertarian Republicans have a variety of motivating issues. On economic and domestic policy, they favor deregulation and tax cuts, repeal of the Affordable Care Act, and protecting gun rights. On social issues, they favor privacy and oppose the USA Patriot Act and oppose the War on Drugs. On foreign and defense policy, libertarian Republicans are isolationists. Some libertarians favor abortion rights, while other libertarian Republicans oppose almost all abortions. Two-thirds of libertarian Republicans are males.

Organizations
The Republican Liberty Caucus, which describes itself as "the oldest continuously operating organization in the Liberty Republican movement with state charters nationwide,"  was founded in 1991. In the 1990s the group's chairs included Chuck Muth, Roger MacBride, and Congressman Ron Paul; in the 2000s, the group's chairs included Dave Nalle. The group's statement of principles affirms "the principle that individual rights and liberties are unlimited" and calls for free trade; the "privatization of all government assets"; the abolition of many federal agencies; the repeal of most current federal taxes in favor of a single flat income tax or national sales tax; and the phase-out of "compulsory government retirement, disability, and health programs."

The House Liberty Caucus was a Congressional caucus formed by Libertarian Representative Justin Amash of Michigan, at the time a Republican. In 2014, the group "consisted of about 30 libertarian-inclined Republicans (and occasional Democratic visitors like Jared Polis)." The group ceased to operate in 2017.

Public figures

Cabinet-level officials 
 Former Director Mick Mulvaney of the Office of Management and Budget; former acting White House Chief of Staff; former U.S. Representative from South Carolina
 Former Director David Stockman of the Office of Management and Budget; former U.S. Representative from Michigan; self-described libertarian.

Representatives 
 Representative Thomas Massie of Kentucky – described as "a Northern Kentucky Republican with libertarian leanings," Massie is a "self-styled libertarian" who has received libertarian support, although he has also described himself as a "'constitutional conservative' within the Republican Party."
 Representative Matt Gaetz of Florida – self-describes as a "libertarian populist" and described by media as having a "strong libertarian streak".
 Representative Warren Davidson of Ohio.
 Representative Tom McClintock of California – described as "libertarian leaning" by Reason magazine.
 Representative Nancy Mace of South Carolina - Described to have a "fusion" of Libertarian views
 Representative Scott Perry of Pennsylvania

Former representatives
 Former Representative Justin Amash of Michigan – Chairman of the Liberty Caucus; left Republican Party in 2019 to become an Independent. He is now a registered member of the Libertarian Party.
 Former Representative Richard L. Hanna of New York
 Former Representative John Hostettler of Indiana
 Former Representative Raúl Labrador of Idaho
 Former Representative Reid Ribble of Wisconsin
 Former Representative Denver Riggleman of Virginia
 Former Representative Dana Rohrabacher of California
 Former Representative Mark Sanford of South Carolina (also a former governor of South Carolina) – a Republican, he's often described as holding libertarian views; claimed to have turned down an offer from Libertarian Party presidential nominee Gary Johnson to be his vice presidential running mate in the 2016 election.
 Former Representative Ted Yoho of Florida
 Former Representative Bob Barr of Georgia
 Former Representative Helen Chenoweth-Hage, of Idaho.
 Former Representative Kerry Bentivolio of Michigan
 Former Representative Connie Mack IV of Florida – described as "a staunch fiscal conservative...with libertarian tendencies."
 Former Representative Ron Paul of Texas – longstanding Libertarian Republican icon; unsuccessfully ran for president in 1988 as the Libertarian nominee, and in 2008 and 2012 as a Republican candidate.
 Former Representatives Howard H. Buffett of Nebraska, Ralph W. Gwinn of New York, Frederick C. Smith of Ohio, and H.R. Gross of Iowa – members of the House described by Murray Rothbard as "extreme right ... solidly isolationist and opposed to foreign wars and interventions, and roughly free-market and libertarian in domestic affairs."

Senators 
 Rand Paul, U.S. Senator from Kentucky (2011–present) – is sometimes regarded as libertarian-leaning, and has on multiple occasions described himself as such when discussing matters like the national debt and other economic issues, domestic surveillance, foreign military intervention, and the war on drugs. However, David Boaz of the Cato Institute notes that "Paul doesn't claim to be a libertarian, and he takes positions that many libertarians disagree with."
 Mike Lee, U.S. Senator from Utah (2011–present) – described as an economic and civil libertarian.
 Cynthia Lummis, U.S. Senator from Wyoming (2021–present) – self-describes as a "libertarian-leaning Republican".

Former senators
 Barry Goldwater, former U.S. Senator from Arizona (1953–1965, 1969–1987)
 Mark Hatfield, former U.S. Senator from Oregon (1967–1997)
 George Frisbie Hoar, former U.S. Senator from Massachusetts (1877–1904)
Jeff Flake, former U.S. Senator from Arizona (2013–2019)

State governors 
 Chris Sununu, 82nd Governor of New Hampshire (2017–present) – As a Republican governor of New Hampshire, Sununu has been described as a "moderate-libertarian".

Former governors
 Gary Johnson, 29th Governor of New Mexico (1995–2003) – served two terms as governor as a Republican and ran for President as a Republican in 2011, but switched from the Republican Party to the Libertarian Party later that year, serving as the Libertarian nominee for president in 2012 and 2016.
 William Weld, 68th Governor of Massachusetts (1991–1997) – As a Republican governor of Massachusetts, Weld self-identified as a libertarian Republican. Later, Weld drifted toward the Libertarian Party. In 2006, Weld unsuccessfully sought the Republican nomination for New York governor; he gained the Libertarian Party endorsement that year before dropping out of the race. In 2016, Weld joined the Libertarian Party to run for vice president as the running mate of Gary Johnson. In 2019, Weld rejoined the Republican Party to launch a primary challenge to President Donald Trump.
 Paul LePage, 74th Governor of Maine (2011–2019) – according to Politico "an insurgency of libertarian activists" supported LePage for Governor in 2010 and LePage has called for a return to Austrian economics.

State legislators 
 Nick Freitas, Virginia state Delegate (2015–present) – Unsuccessfully ran for U.S. Senate in 2018. Described as having a "conservative voting record and libertarian streak."
 Aaron Kaufer, Pennsylvania state representative (2015-present) 
 Anthony Sabatini, Florida state representative (2018–present) – candidate for 2022 United States House of Representatives elections in Florida for Florida's 7th congressional district. Described as a "libertarian-conservative".

Former
 Kurt Bills, former Minnesota state representative (2011–2012) – describes himself as a "libertarian-leaning constitutional conservative"; Reason magazine writes that "most of his positions align with mainstream libertarian ideas. He is hostile to the drug war, favors a non-interventionist foreign policy, and embraces Austrian economics."
 Eric Brakey, former Maine state senator (2014–2018) Unsuccessfully ran for U.S. Senate in 2018. Worked for Ron Paul's 2012 campaign, led the Defense of Liberty PAC.
 Laura Ebke, former Nebraska state senator (2015–2019) – elected to the legislature in 2014 and advanced libertarian positions. She described herself in early 2015 as "a Republican and a conservative libertarian," In 2016, Ebke switched to the Libertarian Party.
 Richard Tisei, former Massachusetts state senator and state Senate minority leader; identifies as a "traditional Northeast libertarian" in the social and fiscal senses.
 Matt Gurtler, Georgia state representative from the 8th district (2017–2021); endorsed by Thomas Massie in his bid for U.S. Representative for Georgia's 9th congressional district. He was dubbed "Mr. No" as a state representative for how many times he voted against legislation and called for restrictions on the IRS.

Authors and scholars 
 Nobel Prize–winning economist Milton Friedman
 Wall Street Journal writer Stephen Moore
 Economist and philosopher Murray Rothbard (until the 1950s)
 Economist Mark Skousen

Others 
 Jerry Doyle, radio talk show host
 Clint Eastwood, actor, filmmaker – describes himself as a libertarian and says that he has "always been a libertarian," but is associated with the Republican Party.
 Jack Hunter, radio talk show host ("The Southern Avenger"), political commentator, former aide to Rand Paul, editor of Rare Politics – has written of his "attraction to libertarianism." Hunter formerly expressed neo-Confederate views, which libertarian commentator and law professor Ilya Somin criticized in 2013 as inconsistent with libertarianism.
 Glenn Jacobs, professional wrestler with WWE and current Republican Mayor of Knoxville, Tennessee.
 Kennedy, TV commentator and former MTV VJ
 Dennis Miller, television personality – described himself as a "conservative libertarian" in the 1990s, although "his commentary always contained a streak of right-wing populism." After the September 11 attacks, Miller's views, particularly on foreign and defense policy, drifted further to the right.
 Grover Norquist, anti-tax activist and Republican figure; economic libertarian identified with "support for supply-side economics and skepticism about climate science."
 P. J. O'Rourke, humorist, author – libertarian-conservative Republican, although he endorsed Democratic nominee Hillary Clinton in the 2016 presidential campaign.
 Austin Petersen, former Libertarian Party presidential candidate and former Republican candidate for US Senate in Missouri in 2018.
 Kid Rock, musician, self-described as libertarian-leaning.
 Wayne Allyn Root, author and radio host
 Peter Schiff, investment broker – described as "libertarian" or "libertarian-leaning"; unsuccessfully sought the Republican nomination for the 2010 election for U.S. Senate in Connecticut.
 Mark Spitznagel, hedge fund manager
 Roger Stone, Republican political consultant, lobbyist and strategist, self-described libertarian.
 Peter Thiel, Silicon Valley businessman, PayPal co-founder – a registered Republican and self-described libertarian.
 Vince Vaughn, actor, self-professed libertarian.
 Tho Bishop, Economist and fellow of the Mises Institute

See also

References 

Libertarianism in the United States
Republican Party (United States) terminology
Right-libertarianism